Hunter's sunbird (Chalcomitra hunteri) is a species of bird in the family Nectariniidae.  It is found in Ethiopia, Kenya, Somalia, South Sudan, Tanzania, and Uganda.

References

Hunter's sunbird
Birds of the Horn of Africa
Hunter's sunbird
Taxonomy articles created by Polbot